Sydney Bartlett (1938/1939 - 19 December 2009) was a Jamaican footballer who played at both professional and international levels as a forward.

Career
Bartlett spent one season with the New York Generals of the NPSL, making three appearances.

He also spent time with the Jamaican national side, appearing in two FIFA World Cup qualifying matches.

Later life and death
Bartlett died in a New York hospital on 19 December 2009, at the age of 70. The KSAFA Syd Bartlett League was named in his honour.

References

1930s births
2009 deaths
Sportspeople from Kingston, Jamaica
Jamaican footballers
Jamaica international footballers
Jamaican expatriate footballers
Jamaican expatriate sportspeople in the United States
Expatriate soccer players in the United States
Association football forwards
New York Generals (NPSL) players
National Professional Soccer League (1967) players